Azerbaijanfilm is an Azerbaijani state film production company. It is located in the capital Baku.

History
"Azerbaijanfilm" was established in 1920 as a photo-cinema department at the Azerbaijan SSR People's Commissariat, and in 1923 renamed as "Azerbaijani Photo-Cinema Office" (AFKI). It went through several name changes, including "Azdovletkino" (1926–1930), "Azkino" (1930–1933), "Azfilm" (1933), "Azdovletkinosenaye" (1934), "Azerfilm" (1935–1940), and "Baku Cinema Studio" (1941–1959), before adopting its present name in 1960 as "Azerbaijanfilm" cinema studio named after Jafar Jabbarly. Currently, "Azerbaijanfilm" is a part of the Ministry of Culture and Tourism of Azerbaijan.

Notable films

Azerbaijan SSR
 1931 Qaz
 1933 Lökbatan
 1945 The Cloth Peddler
 1956 O Olmasin, Bu Olsun
 1961 Balıqçılar
 1963 Kür
 1964 İçəri Şəhər
 1964 Ulduz
 1965 Mingəçevir
 1970 Sevil
 1977 Birthday
 1979 Babek
 1988 The Scoundrel
 1989 Anecdote

Azerbaijan
 1991 The Engagement Ring
 1998 Sari Gelin
 2001 The Dream
 2004 National Bomb
 2009 The 40th Door
 2010 The Precinct
 2011 Buta
 2012 Amazing Azerbaijan (documentary)
 2012 Steppe Man
 2014 Nabat

See also
 Cinema of Azerbaijan
 List of Azerbaijani films

References

External links
 Official website 
 Azeri films 
 Azerbaijani film at the Internet Movie Database
 Azerbaycan Kinosu 

 
Film production companies of Azerbaijan
Film production companies of the Soviet Union
Azerbaijani animation studios
Mass media companies established in 1920
1920 establishments in Azerbaijan
Soviet animation studios